Rise of the Teenage Mutant Ninja Turtles (also known as Rise of the TMNT and ROTTMNT) is an American animated television series developed and executive produced by Andy Suriano and Ant Ward, and based on the comic book characters created by Kevin Eastman and Peter Laird. The series premiered on Nickelodeon on July 20, 2018, with premieres later moving to Nicktoons, which aired new episodes until August 7, 2020.

The series was announced by Nickelodeon on March 2, 2017, and was initially scheduled to run for at least 26 episodes. This re-imagined series has the Turtles go on new adventures as they seek to unlock the mystical secrets of New York City and their own powers to save the world from evil.

On July 27, 2018, Nickelodeon renewed the series for a second season consisting of 26 episodes before the official debut of the first season. Partway into the production of this season, however, it was shortened in length to 13 episodes. The final episode aired on August 7, 2020. A feature film sequel was released on Netflix on August 5, 2022 following the series finale.

Plot

Deep in the sewers of New York City, four mutant turtle brothers lurk. Raphael, Donatello, Leonardo and Michelangelo (calling themselves the Mad Dogs) are in their early teen years and the brothers go on new and exciting adventures. They tap into their mystic ninja powers to learn to work together as a cohesive unit and become a team of heroes as they navigate the modern world and other hidden realms. The brothers get a whole new look, new weapons, and new powers as they discover the hidden city beneath New York and find time for a slice of their favorite pizza.

In the first season, the turtle brothers, along with their friend, April O'Neil, meet an evil alchemist named Baron Draxum, and the dangerous Foot Clan. They also learn of their Master Splinter's secret: that he was once martial arts expert, and movie star, Lou Jitsu. They must collect pieces of an ancient dark armor called the Kuroi Yōroi to prevent the Foot and Draxum from resurrecting the Shredder, a demon once banished by Splinter's ancestors. 

In the second season, the brothers face new and old enemies, most notably the evil Shredder, and must stop him from destroying the world. In the process, they must also help Baron Draxum discover his own better nature.

Characters

Production
On March 2, 2017, Rise of the Teenage Mutant Ninja Turtles was announced as a new re-imagining of the Teenage Mutant Ninja Turtles franchise. The series was originally intended to have 26 episodes and launch in Fall 2018. Cyma Zarghami, president of the Nickelodeon Group, stated in a press release:
"The Turtles is a property that has reinvention in its DNA, which keeps it fresh and relevant to every new generation while satisfying the demand from its adult fans. 'Turtles' has been an incredibly important franchise for us since we reignited it five years ago, and we’re excited for the new series to take the characters in a different direction with more humor, a younger and lighter feel, and all-new dimensions to explore".

The series logotype was revealed to the public in mid-October 2017. That November, Nickelodeon announced the official voice actor cast for the main characters on the turtles' side. In addition to this news, voice actor Rob Paulsen, who previously voiced Raphael in the 1987–96 TV series and Donatello in the 2012–17 TV series, served as the voice director for this TV series. John Cena was later cast as the villain Baron Draxum. Besides voice directing, Rob Paulsen provided voice work alongside fellow voice actor Maurice LaMarche. The animation services for Rise of the Teenage Mutant Ninja Turtles are provided by the Australian animation studio Flying Bark Productions.

The major main-characters art designs were announced and revealed by Nickelodeon in February 2018. This occurred during a Facebook event, which was broadcast live that day. On March 23, 2018, the first trailer for the series was released by Nickelodeon. Each episode consists of two 11-minute carts and each of them tell self-contained, standalone stories with hints of a larger plot. The show aired as a sneak peek after the 2018 Kids' Choice Sports in July and later premiered on Nickelodeon on September 17, 2018.
On July 27, 2018, Nickelodeon renewed the series for a 26-episode second season. However, the season order was later reduced to 13 episodes.

Episodes

Series overview

Season 1 (2018–19)

Season 2 (2019–20)

Shorts

Broadcast
The series premiered on Nickelodeon in the United States on September 17, 2018. By that time, the series had already premiered as a sneak preview on YTV in Canada on July 27 the same year and was premiered officially on September 21 that year. In the UK, the show airs on Nicktoons and Channel 5. Episodes have also sometimes aired on both channels at the same time for terrestrial rights.

DVD
Nickelodeon and Paramount Home Entertainment are currently releasing single-volume DVDs of the series, each containing 6-7 non-sequential episodes.

Awards and nominations

Film

On February 5, 2019, it was announced that a feature film based on the series was in production for Netflix, along with a feature film based on The Loud House. Rise of the Teenage Mutant Ninja Turtles: The Movie follows Leonardo forced to lead his brothers Raph, Donnie, and Mikey against alien invaders known as the Krang. Casey Jones makes his debut and is voiced by Haley Joel Osment. The film had been slated to release in 2021, but ended up landing an August 5, 2022 release date.

Merchandise and media

Comics
IDW published a comic book based on the series, beginning in July 2018. The comics concluded with an introductory issue (#0), a five-issue main story and a Halloween Comicfest special. After a period of inactivity, it was continued with a three-issue story arc titled "Sound Off!" from July to September 2019.

Toys
On February 16, 2018, the first toys based on the series were presented during the New York City Toy Fair. The first Rise of the Teenage Mutant Ninja Turtles toys were released on October 1, 2018.

In August 2018, the American fast-food chain Sonic Drive-In released a set of kids' meal toys based on the series, which were available in their Wacky Pack meals.

Video game
During the months leading up to the series' launch, Viacom and Nintendo collaborated to market Rise of the Teenage Mutant Ninja Turtles via a special limited-time online multiplayer event for the 2017 video game Splatoon 2, in which Inklings can participate in a Splatfest tournament, battling over which of the four brothers is the best. Donnie won overall, beating Mikey in the first round, and Raph (who had in turn beat Leo) in the finals.

References

External links

 
 

2018 American television series debuts
2010s American animated television series
2010s American children's television series
2010s American comic science fiction television series
2010s Nickelodeon original programming
2020 American television series endings
2020s American animated television series
2020s American children's television series
2020s American comic science fiction television series
2020s Nickelodeon original programming
English-language television shows
Anime-influenced Western animated television series
American children's animated action television series
American children's animated adventure television series
American children's animated comic science fiction television series
American children's animated superhero television series
American children's animated science fantasy television series
Television shows set in New York City
Teenage Mutant Ninja Turtles television series
Animated television series reboots
Nicktoons
Animated television series about turtles
Teen animated television series
Television series about revenge